Deadbeat Darling is a four-piece rock band which formed in New York City in 2006.  The band's sound is a blend of several musical genres, including rock, surf, reggae, dub and trip hop.  They have released one EP and two full-length albums. 

BlackBook Magazine also named Deadbeat Darling one of the Best Bands of CMJ 2010. 

The band recorded their next record, The Angel's Share, at Monnow Valley Studio in Wales with Grammy award winning producer Ken Nelson (Coldplay, Gomez, The Charlatans) and Grammy award winning mixer Adrian Bushby (Foo Fighters, Muse, My Bloody Valentine) in May 2011, and released the album in April 2012.  After the Angel's Share tour, the band went on hiatus, and Joseph recorded a solo album in 2013.

Members
Joseph King - guitar, lead vocals
Mohit Bhansali - lead guitar, backing vocals
Evan Howard - drums, percussion, effects
Ian Everall - bass

Discography
Belle Epoch, EP (2007)
Weight of Wandering (2009)
The Angels Share (2012)

Tours
February/March 2013 - California Tour
Summer 2012 - Dead of Summer Tour with Girl in a Coma
Spring 2012 - South by Southwest Tour
February 2012 - UK Tour
Summer 2011 - Dead of Summer Tour
May 2010 - East vs. West Tour with The Tender Box
October 2010 - UK Tour
Summer 2009 - Support for Blue October
Summer 2008 - Goodnight Summer Tour with Deep Ella and Johnny Goudie
May 2008 - Liars and Saints Tour with Johnny Goudie and Alpha Rev

References

External links
Deadbeat Darling Official Website
BlackBook Magazine Exclusive:  The 28 Best Bands of CMJ

Alternative rock groups from New York (state)
Indie rock musical groups from New York (state)
Musical groups established in 2006
Trip hop groups
Musical groups from Brooklyn
2006 establishments in New York City